Dancesport at the 2010 Asian Games was held in Zengcheng Gymnasium, Guangzhou, China from 13 November to 14 November 2010.

Schedule

Medalists

Standard

Latin

Medal table

Participating nations
A total of 108 athletes from 12 nations competed in dancesport at the 2010 Asian Games:

References

ADSF Website

External links
Dancesport Site of 2010 Asian Games

 
2010 Asian Games events
2010
2010 in dancesport